Marion Independent School District is a public school district based in Marion, Texas (USA).

In addition to Marion, the district also serves the cities of Santa Clara and New Berlin as well as the community of Zuehl.

In 2009, the school district was rated "academically acceptable" by the Texas Education Agency.

References

External links

School districts in Guadalupe County, Texas